The 1948 United States presidential election in Kentucky took place on November 2, 1948, as part of the 1948 United States presidential election. Kentucky voters chose 11 representatives, or electors, to the Electoral College, who voted for president and vice president.

Kentucky was won by incumbent President Harry S. Truman (D–Missouri), running with Senator Alben W. Barkley, with 56.74 percent of the popular vote, against Governor Thomas Dewey (R–New York), running with Governor Earl Warren, with 41.48 percent of the popular vote.

Dewey performed worse than he had four years previously, with both his margin of loss increasing, and the percentage of the vote he received decreasing, even as he fared a lot better nationally than he had four years prior. This discrepancy was at least in part due to the choice of President Truman's running mate, Senator Barkley, who himself came from the Bluegrass State.

Results

Results by county

References

Kentucky
1948
1948 Kentucky elections